The following is a list of the MTV Europe Music Award winners and nominees for Best Latin American Act.

2010's

See also 
 MTV Video Music Award for Best Latin Artist
 MTV VMA International Viewer's Choice Award for MTV Brasil
 MTV VMA International Viewer's Choice Award for MTV Latin America
 MTV VMA International Viewer's Choice Award for MTV Internacional
 MTV Video Music Brazil

MTV Europe Music Awards
Awards established in 2011